A list of towns and villages in the Aberdeenshire council area of Scotland.

 

A
Aberchirder
Aboyne
Aikenshill
Alford
Allanaquoich
Aquithie
Arbuthnott
Ardiffery
Ardmachron
Ardonald
Ardoyne
Auchallater
Auchattie
Auchedly
Auchenblae
Auchlee
Auchleven
Auchlossan
Auchmacoy
Auchnagatt
Auchnerran
Auchterless
Auldyoch

B
Backburn
Backhill
Badenscoth
Badenyon
Bainshole
Balfour
Ballater
Ballogie
Balmain
Balmedie
Banchory
Banchory-Devenick
Banff
Barthol Chapel
Belhelvie
Bellabeg
Benholm
Birse
Birsemore
Blackburn
Blackdog
Blair
Boddam
Bogbrae
Bogniebrae
Bograxie
Bogton
Bonnykelly
Bonnyton
Borrowfield
Bowness
Boyndie
Braegarie
Braehead
Braemar
Brathens
Bressachoil farmstead
Brideswell
Bridge of Alford
Bridge of Canny
Bridge of Gairn
Bridge of Muchalls
Bridgend
Broadsea
Buchanhaven
Bullers of Buchan
Burn of Logie
Burnfield

C
Cairnie
Cairnleith Crofts
Cairnorrie
Cammachmore
Catterline
Chapelton
Clatt
Clerkhill
Cloak
Clola
Coalford
Cock Bridge
Collieston
Colpy
Cookney
Corgarff
Coriestane
Cornhill
Corriemulzie
Cortes
Cottown
Cowie
Craigdam
Crathie
Crawton
Crimond
Crovie
Cruden Bay
Cuminestown
Cushnie

D
Daviot
Dess
Dinnet
Downiehills
Downies
Drumblade
Drumlithie
Drumoak
Dubford
Dunbennan
Dunecht
Durno

E
Echt
Edzell Woods
Elliewell
Ellon
Elrick
Eslie

F
Fawside
Fermtoun of Upperton
Fetterangus
Fettercairn
Findlater
Findon
Finzean
Folla Rule
Footie
Forbes
Fordoun
Fordyce
Forgue
Fortie
Fortree
Forvie
Foveran
Fraserburgh
Fyvie

G
Gardenstown
Garlogie
Garmond
Gartly
Gight
Glenbervie
Gordonstown
Gourdon
Grange

H
Harlaw
Hatton
Hatton of Fintray
Huntly

I
Insch
Inverallochy and Cairnbulg
Inverbervie
Inverey
Inverkeithny
Inverugie
Inverurie
Ironside

J
Johnshaven

K
Keig
Kemnay
Kennethmont
Kildrummy
Kincardine O'Neil
King Edward
Kingseat
Kinmuck
Kinneff
Kintore
Kirkton of Durris
Kirkton of Tough
Kirktown
Kirktown of Fetteresso

L
Laurencekirk
Lebano
Lochton
Logie Coldstone
Longhaven
Longmanhill
Longside
Lonmay
Lost
Ludquharn
Lumphanan
Lumsden
Luthermuir

M
Macduff
Mains Of Slains
Mariewell
Marnoch
Maryculter
Marykirk
Marywell
Maud
Meikle Wartle
Memsie
Mergie
Methlick
Midmar
Milton of Crathes
Mintlaw
Monymusk
Mossat
Muchalls

N
Nether Kinmundy
Netherbrae
Netherley
New Aberdour
New Byth
New Deer
New Leeds
New Pitsligo
Newburgh
Newmachar
Newtonhill

O
Old Deer
Old Rayne
Oldmeldrum
Ordiquhill
Oyne

P
Peathill
Pennan
Peterhead
Pitcaple
Pitmedden
Pittodrie (village)
Plaidy
Port Erroll
Portlethen
Portlethen Village
Portsoy
Potarch
Potterton

R
Rattray
Relaquheim farmstead
Rhynie
Rora
Rosehearty
Rothienorman
Ruthven
Ryland

S
Sandend
Sandhaven
Sauchen
St Combs
St Cyrus
St Fergus
St John's Well
Stirling Village
Stonehaven
Strachan
Strathbogie
Strathdon
Strichen
Stuartfield

T
Tarland
Tarves
Tewel
The Colony
Tifty
Tillykerrie
Tillykerrie
Tillylain
Tillyorn
Tornaveen
Torphins
Towie
Tullich
Tullynessle
Turriff
Tyrie

U
Udny Green
Udny Station

W
Wartle
Westburn
Wester Beltie
Westhill
Whinnyfold
Whitecairns
Whitehills
Whiterashes
Woodfield
Woodhead, Aberdeenshire

Y
Ythanbank
Ythanwells
Ythsie

See also
List of places in Scotland

Aberdeenshire
Geography of Aberdeenshire
Lists of places in Scotland
Populated places in Scotland